The following are the football (soccer) events of the year 1953 throughout the world.

Events
 April 19 – The Netherlands plays its 200th official match in history, losing 0–2 in a friendly against neighbouring Belgium.
 May 2 – Blackpool win the FA Cup Final, their only major championship title to date, beating Bolton Wanderers 4–3, despite the score being 1–3 with a few minutes remaining.
 November 25 – England v Hungary (1953). It was the first time England had lost at Wembley Stadium home venue to a nation outside the British Isles.
 Dynamo Dresden was founded.

Winners club national championship
: River Plate
: R.F.C. Liégeois
: Millonarios FC
: KB
: Dynamo Dresden
: Arsenal F.C.
: Stade de Reims
: Panathinaikos F.C.
: Internazionale Milano F.C.
: Shelbourne F.C.
: Tampico
: RCH
: Glentoran F.C.
: Ruch Chorzów
: Sporting
: CCA București
: Rangers F.C.
: FC Barcelona
: Malmö FF
: 1. FC Kaiserslautern
: FC Spartak Moscow

International tournaments
1953 British Home Championship (October 4, 1952 – April 18, 1953)
Shared by  & 
1953 Small Club World Cup  (February 11, 1953 – February 21, 1953)
Millonarios FC 
1953 Small Club World Cup  (July 11, 1953 – August 2, 1953)
Corinthians 

 South American Championship in Peru (February 22 – April 1, 1953)

Births
 January 1 – Peter John Taylor, English footballer and manager
 January 4 – Norberto Alonso, Argentinean footballer
 January 6 – Manfred Kaltz, German footballer
 March 1 – Carlos Queiroz, Portuguese manager
 March 3 – Zico, Brazilian footballer and manager
 March 11 – László Bölöni, Romanian footballer and manager
 April 1 – Pavol Biroš, Czech footballer (died 2020)
 April 1 – Alberto Zaccheroni, Italian manager
 April 10 – Søren Busk, Danish footballer
 April 21 – Hans Verèl, Dutch footballer and manager (died 2019)
 April 28 – Brian Greenhoff, English footballer (died 2013)
 May 6    – Graeme Souness, Scottish footballer and manager
 May 22 – Paul Mariner, English footballer (died 2021)
 May 25 – Daniel Passarella, Argentinean footballer and manager
 May 25 – Gaetano Scirea, Italian footballer (died 1989)
 June 19 – Jan van Deinsen, Dutch footballer
 July 20 – Ladislav Jurkemik, Slovak footballer
 July 22 – René Vandereycken, Belgian footballer and manager
 July 26 – Felix Magath, German footballer and manager
 September 15 – Gerrie Kleton, Dutch footballer (died 2006)
 September 27 – Claudio Gentile, Italian footballer
 October 14 – Aldo Maldera, Italian footballer (died 2012)
 October 16 – Paulo Roberto Falcão, Brazilian footballer and manager
 November 29 – Huub Stevens, Dutch footballer and manager
 December 4 – Jean-Marie Pfaff, Belgian footballer

Deaths

 
Association football by year